Asian Women is a quarterly peer-reviewed academic journal and the official journal of the Research Institute of Asian Women (Sookmyung Women's University). Its focus is recent gender issues and its editor-in-chief is Youngshin Kim.

Abstracting and indexing 
The journal is abstracted and indexed in:
 Social Sciences Citation Index
 Scopus

According to the Journal Citation Reports, the journal has a 2015 impact factor of 1.625, ranking it 5th out of 40 journals in the category "Women's Studies".

See also 
 List of women's studies journals

References 

Asian studies journals
English-language journals
Quarterly journals
Women's studies journals
Publications established in 1995
Women in Asia